40 Greatest Hits is a greatest hits album by Perry Como. It was released by K-Tel by arrangement with RCA Records in 1975 and peaked at number one on the UK Albums Chart. It was the Christmas number two album that year. The album was not issued in the United States & has never had an official CD release in the UK.

Track listing

Side One
Magic Moments
Caterina
Catch a Falling Star
I Know
When You Were Sweet Sixteen
I Believe
Try To Remember
Love Makes The World Go Round
Prisoner Of Love
Don't Let the Stars Get in Your Eyes

Side Two
Hot Diggity
Round and Round
If I Loved You
Hello Young Lovers
Delaware
Moonglow
Killing Me Softly
More
Dear Hearts and Gentle People
I Love You & Don't You Forget It

Side Three
And I Love You So
For The Good Times
Close To You
Seattle
Tie A Yellow Ribbon
Walk Right Back
What Kind of Fool Am I?
Days of Wine and Roses
Where Do I Begin
Without A Song

Side Four
It's Impossible
I Think of You
If
We've Only Just Begun
I Want To Give
Raindrops Keep Falling On My Head
You Make Me Feel So Young
Temptation
The Way We Were
Sing

Chart performance

Weekly charts

Year-end charts

Certifications and sales

References

Perry Como albums
1975 greatest hits albums